The Captain of Venice is a 1951 Italian historical adventure film directed by Gianni Puccini and starring Leonardo Cortese, Mariella Lotti, and Andrea Checchi.

The film's sets were designed by the art director Arrigo Equini.

Main cast

References

Bibliography

External links
 

1951 films
1950s Italian-language films
1950s historical adventure films
Films directed by Gianni Puccini
Italian historical adventure films
Italian black-and-white films
1950s Italian films